The Dnipro Metro is a single-line rapid transit system that serves the city of Dnipro, the fourth largest city in Ukraine by population. The metro was the third system constructed in Ukraine, after the Kyiv and Kharkiv metro systems, respectively, when it opened on December 29, 1995. The metro was the fourteenth built in the former Soviet Union region, and the first to open after the collapse of the Soviet Union in 1991.

The Dnipro Metro consists of one  line and just 6 stations, making it one of the smallest metro systems in the world. The line starts at  station, near the city's central railway station in the east and ends at  station in the western part of the city. The system is open from 05:30 to 23:00. Ridership on the metro has steadily declined since its opening in 1995. In 2013, the metro carried 7.51 million passengers compared to 18.2 million in 1995. Initially, the metro trains carried five train cars each, but as the passenger ridership declined, the number of cars was reduced to three. The price for a single ride is currently ₴8; either plastic tokens or transit cards are used at the entrance gates.

History
With help from the First Secretary of the Central Committee of the Communist Party of Ukraine Vladimir Shcherbitsky, in 1979 the Council of Ministers of the Soviet Union affirmed the Central Committee of the Communist Party's plan of action to allow the Gosplan (government planning agency) and the communication and transportation construction ministries to conduct research on the construction of a metropolitan system in Dnipropetrovsk.

A second line was planned to pass through residential areas and industrial enterprises of the southern right-bank part of the city, Lenin Square and residential areas on the left bank of the Dnieper. A third was planned to connect through "the center quarters of the southwestern part with the north on the left bank of the Dnieper." A planned fourth line would run along the left bank and cross residential areas and industrial areas of the northern part of the city. In November 2018 city authorities expected these three new stations to be opened by the summer of 2023.

On March 15, 1982, following a decree by the Council of Ministers of the Soviet Union the Dnipro Metro was included in the list of first-priority construction projects. It was planned to be finished by the 12th five-year plan. Soon after the death of Leonid Brezhnev on 10 November 1982 the country ended up in economic hardship and financing of the project was reduced. In 1988 Mikhail Gorbachev visited Dnipro and promised the residents to help with finishing the projects. His promises were left unrealized. 

With the dissolution of the Soviet Union, the project was halted. In 1994 it was decided to force the completion of the project and with the help of the chairman of the regional council Pavlo Lazarenko, these plans were realised when the system's first line, the Tsentralno-Zavodska Line, was opened to the public on December 29, 1995.

The Dnipro Metro system was constructed following the typical Soviet metro construction format. Out of the six stations, five are located deep underground and one is placed near the surface. Four of the deep stations are single vaults built on Leningrad technology and one is a Pylon. The only shallow station is a pillar trispan. Owing to the economic recession of the early 1990s, the metro stations lack the same level of decoration and architectural integrity as those built in Soviet times.

Future growth
Construction on these three stations was restarted in late February 2011 after being completely halted in July 2009. A lack of funding for the construction also was because Dnipropetrovsk was not chosen as one of the host cities of the UEFA Euro 2012 football championship.

In June 2014, President Petro Poroshenko signed the 2014 budget into law which will allocate funding to the "Dnipropetrovskyi Metropoliten" company for the completion of the metro line. The two new stations in the city centre, Teatralna and Tsentralna, were expected to be finished by 2015, whilst Muzeina was according to plans to be finished by 2016. Another station, "Parus", is planned for the western terminus of the Tsentralno-Zavodska Line. 

Construction did not start because the tender to select the contractor was stopped by the city council in August 2015. In the summer of 2016, the mayor of Dnipro Borys Filatov and representatives of Limak Holding signed a contract to build the Dnipro subway. The active phase of work started in April 2017. 

In November 2018, city authorities expected the three new stations to be opened by the summer of 2023. At the beginning of 2019, it was announced that there were allocated some ₴1.4 billion as a subvention from the state budget. In December 2020 Dnipro authorities claimed that the new stations would be opened in 2024.

After the first additions to the line segment, the total length of the only line is expected to be , with 9 stations. In the long-term perspective, a second line is planned to span across the River Dnieper, and potentially have  of track on three lines minimum.

Network Map

See also
 Kyiv Metro
 Kharkiv Metro
 Kryvyi Rih Metrotram

References

External links

  
  
 
 
 Daryna Sukhonis. . Visti Prydniprovia. 9 November 2016
 Olga Fomenko. . Anti-corr. 27 February 2019
 Yegor Moroz. . 49000.com. 26 April 2018

 
Underground rapid transit in Ukraine
Transport in Dnipro
Railway lines opened in 1995
1995 establishments in Ukraine